Back to Back Theatre is an Australian theater company that engages with disabilities on stage. The company is based in Geelong, Victoria creating its work nationally and touring around the world. The work produced by the company explores questions about politics, ethics, and philosophy in humanity.

The company originated in 1987, and a year later its first performance Big Bag was put on stage. In 1999 the company gained an Artistic Director Bruce Gladwin who helped nurture the company's unique artistic voice with an emphasis on the ensemble's commentaries on broad social and cultural dialogue. Created through a process of research, improvisation and scripting, new work is realized via collaboration between the ensemble, artistic directors, and guest artists.

The ensemble currently consists of six actors, all of whom are neurodivergent or disabled. As of May 2022 the Back to Back ensemble is: Simon Laherty, Sarah Mainwaring, Scott Price, Mark Deans, and Breanna Deleo.

Back to Back Theater reached its first international attention in 2007 after touring with small metal objects and winning a Green Room Award. Another play Ganesh versus the Third Reich revolved around ideas of eugenics and Nazism and received a Helpmann award after its first performance in 2012. In 2019 the company also engaged in some film work creating Oddlands a 28-minute pilot for TV that will grow into a six-part series.

The size of the company's cast and narrow demographic received some criticism for avoiding the inclusion of conversation about race in the disability movement.

In 2013 Back to Back theater published a book We're People Who Do Shows ― Back to Back Theatre Performance, Politics, Visibility that expanded on the company's artistic vision, process, and history.

Currently, the company has been working on a film Shadow that will be showcased at Sydney Film Festival on June 15, 2022. The film is a contradictory commentary on activism in disabled communities.

Touring works 

 Single Channel Video
 Shadow film
 The Shadow Whose Prey the Hunter Becomes
 Ganesh Versus the Third Reich
 Small Metal Objects
 The Democratic Set
 Food Court
 Lady Eats Apple

Awards 
For Back to Back Theatre
 International Ibsen Award (2022)
 Australian Disability Enterprise of Excellence Award (2012)
 Sidney Myer Performing Arts Awards - Group Award (2005)

Ganesh Versus the Third Reich
 Edinburgh International Festival Herald Angel Critics' Award (2014)
 Kunstfest Weimar Very Young Jury's All Round Award (2014)
 Green Room Award Best Ensemble Performance in Alternative & Hybrid Performance (2012)
 Green Room Award Best Direction in Theatre (2012)
 Green Room Award Best Production in Theatre (2012)
 Helpmann Award for Best Play (2012)
 Melbourne Festival Age Critics' Award (2012)
 Kit Denton Fellowship for Theatrical Courage (2009)

Small Metal Objects
 Bessie Award, New York (2008)
 Green Room Award - Best Theatre Production (New Form), Victoria (2007)
 ZKB Appreciation Prize, Zurich Theatre Festival (2007)
 Inaugural Age Critics' Special Commendation, Melbourne Festival (2005)

Soft
 The Age Critics' Award for Creative Excellence, Melbourne Festival (2002)

References 

 
 
 https://web.archive.org/web/20160314205655/http://creative.vic.gov.au/Arts_in_Victoria/Features/Feature_Stories/Challenging_perceptions_Geelong%E2%80%99s_Back_to_Back_Theatre
 
 
 
 
 https://web.archive.org/web/20160819051347/http://www.performingartsmarket.com.au/program/details/lady-eats-apple

  Roger Wooster (2009) Creative inclusion in community theatre: a journey with Odyssey Theatre, Research in Drama Education: The Journal of Applied Theatre and Performance, 14:1, 79–90, DOI: 10.1080/13569780802655814
  Schmidt, T. (2013). Acting, Disabled: Back to Back Theatre and the Politics of Appearance. In K. Jüers-Munby, J. Carroll, & S. Giles (Eds.), Postdramatic Theatre and the Political: International Perspectives on Contemporary Performance (1st ed., pp. 189–207). Bloomsbury Methuen Drama. https://kclpure.kcl.ac.uk/portal/files/37318239/Schmidt_Back_to_Back_Theatre_and_the_politics_of_appearance.pdf 
  H., Grehan, (2013). 'We're people who do shows': Back to Back Theatre - Performance Politics Visibility. PR Books. OCLC 864694297.
  Titchkosky, T. (2003). Chapter 6: Revealing Culture's Eye. In Disability, self, and Society. Essay.
  Dave Calvert (2016) 'Everything Has a Fucking Value': Negative Dialectics in the Work of Back to Back Theatre, Contemporary Theatre Review, 26:2, 134–152, DOI: 10.1080/10486801.2015.1105799

External links 
 

Theatre companies in Australia
Performing arts in Victoria (Australia)
Disability theatre